Anolis rimarum, the Artibonite bush anole or marmelade anole, is a species of lizard in the family Dactyloidae. The species is found in Haiti.

References

Anoles
Reptiles described in 1967
Endemic fauna of Haiti
Reptiles of Haiti
Taxa named by Richard Thomas (herpetologist)
Taxa named by Albert Schwartz (zoologist)